Willie Gary may refer to:

Willie E. Gary (born 1947), American attorney
Willie Gary (American football) (born 1978), American football player